Nikola Špirić (born 4 September 1956) is a Bosnian Serb politician who served as Chairman of the Council of Ministers of Bosnia and Herzegovina from 2007 to 2012. He has been a member of the national House of Peoples since 2019.

Špirić also served as Minister of Finance and Treasury from 2012 to 2015. He was previously a member of the House of Representatives from 2002 to 2007.

Špirić was a member of the Party of Democratic Progress, until he left it in 2002 to join the Alliance of Independent Social Democrats.

Early life and education
Born in Drvar, PR Bosnia and Herzegovina, at the time FPR Yugoslavia, Špirić completed elementary education in his hometown, high school in Sarajevo and his undergraduate and postgraduate education at the University of Sarajevo. He holds a Ph.D. in economics. His doctoral thesis was in monetary and public finance.

Early career
Špirić has been an economics professor at the University of Banja Luka since 1992. He held a number of governmental positions including a 2-year term as a representative at the Parliamentary Assembly of Bosnia and Herzegovina for Milorad Dodik's SNSD party. He was a member of the House of Peoples from 2001 until 2003 and a member of the House of Representatives from 2002 until 2007.

Chairman of the Council of Ministers (2007–2012)

On 11 January 2007, Špirić became the new Chairman of the Council of Ministers of Bosnia and Herzegovina, succeeding Adnan Terzić. On 1 November 2007, he tendered his resignation in protest of parliamentary reforms imposed by High Representative Miroslav Lajčák. Špirić felt that the reforms would reduce the influence of Bosnia's Serb population. The resignation was deemed by some to be the country's most serious crisis since the end of the Bosnian War. After the crisis was resolved, he was renominated for the Chairman's post on 10 December 2007, confirmed by the Presidency on 27 December 2007 and by Parliament a day later, on 28 December.

Špirić's government led Bosnia and Herzegovina's economic recovery following the Great Recession and the financial crisis of 2007–2008.

On 26 May 2008, Špirić met with European Commissioner for Justice, Freedom and Security Jacques Barrot, discussing about abolition of the European Union visa regime for Bosnian citizens. In September 2009, his government managed to succeed in its plans and Bosnia and Herzegovina met the conditions for visa waiver.

In July 2009, Špirić's cabinet approved the Law Against Discrimination, prohibiting discrimination based on sex, gender expression and sexual orientation, a law having to do with LGBT rights in Bosnia and Herzegovina. Furthermore, the law forbids harassment and segregation on the basis of sexual orientation. Furthermore, the law forbids harassment and segregation on the basis of sexual orientation.

On 12 January 2012, he was succeeded as Chairman of the Council of Ministers by Vjekoslav Bevanda, following the 2010 general election and the one-year governmental formation crisis.

Later career
From January 2012 until March 2015, Špirić served as Minister of Finance and Treasury in the cabinet of Vjekoslav Bevanda.

In September 2018, the United States Department of State put Špirić under sanctions (travel ban and asset freeze), with the justification that "Špirić engaged in and benefited from public corruption, including the acceptance of improper benefits in exchange for the performance of public functions and interference with public processes, during his tenure as a member of the House of Representatives in Bosnia and Herzegovina." Špirić accused the U.S. Ambassador in Bosnia and Herzegovina to harm his chances of re-election.

Since February 2019, Špirić has once again been a member of the House of Peoples. In September 2020, he was appointed member of the Parliamentary Committee for the selection and monitoring of the work of the Bosnian Agency for the Prevention of Corruption and Coordination of the Fight against Corruption (APIK). This raised criticism given that he remains under U.S. sanctions for corruption.

Personal life
Špirić is married and has two children. On 18 January 2021, he was admitted to hospital due to bilateral pneumonia.

References

External links

Nikola Špirić at imovinapoliticara.cin.ba

|-

1956 births
Living people
People from Drvar
University of Sarajevo alumni
Academic staff of the University of Banja Luka
Party of Democratic Progress politicians
Alliance of Independent Social Democrats politicians
Members of the House of Peoples of Bosnia and Herzegovina
Chairmen of the House of Peoples of Bosnia and Herzegovina
Members of the House of Representatives (Bosnia and Herzegovina)
Chairmen of the House of Representatives (Bosnia and Herzegovina)
Government ministers of Bosnia and Herzegovina
Finance ministers of Bosnia and Herzegovina